Expert Political Judgment: How Good Is It? How Can We Know? is a 2005 book by Philip E. Tetlock. The book mentions how experts are often no better at making predictions than most other people, and how when they are wrong, they are rarely held accountable.

References

2005 non-fiction books
American political books
Political science books
Princeton University Press books